Romesh Brij Sharma is an Indian film producer, actor and director. Under his banner Romesh Films, he has been actively involved in the production of films and television shows for over 30 years.

Personal life
His son Karan Sharma is also an actor and has worked in Indian and Mauritian films/television shows. His daughter Neema Sharma is married to Ayaan Ali Khan, the son of sarod player Amjad Ali Khan.

Career
One of the most notable movies produced by Romesh Sharma was the 1991 blockbuster film Hum starring Amitabh Bachchan. In that movie, he also played a small role of Jumalina Gonsalves' (played by Kimi Katkar) brother. In 1987 he produced Diljalaa starring Jackie Shroff. The film Dil Jo Bhi Kahey... that he directed featured and Annabelle Wallis and Romesh's son Karan Sharma. He became known for his acting role in 1972 American movie ‘Siddhartha’, directed by Conrad Rooks. In that box-office hit movie Simi Garewal and Shashi Kapoor played the lead roles.

In the 1980s his company Sharma Limited founded Cloud 9 Studio at Le Goulet, Baie du Tombeau on the north-western coast of Mauritius. Several movies and advertisement clips were made at Cloud 9 Studio by various movie-makers from South Africa, Japan, India and Mauritius. These include Dil Jo Bhi Kahey, Kuch Kuch Hota Hai, Armaan, Hello Brother, and Kuch na Kaho. However in 2014 Sharma Limited announced plans to demolish the studio in order to re-develop the site into a 3-star hotel.

Filmography
The list of films that Romesh Sharma has produced, directed or acted in includes the following:  
2005 Dil Jo Bhi Kahey
2003 C'est La Vie (Mauritian TV Series) (TV series "Such is Life")
1994 Suhaag
1991 Hum 
1987 Diljalaa 
1986 Mera Dharam
1985 Aitbaar
1983 Lal Chunariyaa (actor under director Sundershan Lal) 
1980 Teen Ekkey (director Joginder)
1980 The Burning Train
1977 Nachdi Jawani as Denu (Punjabi Movie)
1977 Chhota Baap (director: Shantilal Soni)
1976 Aaj Ka Ye Ghar
1976 Sajjo Rani
1976 Fauji (director: Joginder)
1976 Koi Jeeta Koi Hara (director: Samir Ganguly)
1975 Sunehra Sansar (director: Adurthi Subba Rao) 
1974 Parinay (director: Kantilal Rathod)
1974 Alingan (director: C.L. Dheer) 
1972 Siddhartha (director: Conrad Rooks)

References

External links
 Romesh Sharma Complete Filmography
Interview with Romesh Sharma during the 2017 Mauritius Cinema Week
Romesh Sharma Films
  *

Living people
People from Gurdaspur
Male actors in Hindi cinema
Indian male film actors
Film producers from Punjab, India
Film directors from Punjab, India
Indian male television actors
Indian television producers
Indian television directors
Indian male voice actors
Film and Television Institute of India alumni
Director whose film won the Best Debut Feature Film National Film Award
Year of birth missing (living people)